{{Infobox election
| election_name = 2022 Connecticut House of Representatives elections
| country = Connecticut
| type = legislative
| ongoing = no
| previous_election = 2020 Connecticut House of Representatives election
| previous_year = 2020
| next_election = 2024 Connecticut House of Representatives election
| next_year = 2024
| seats_for_election = All 151 seats in the Connecticut House of Representatives
| majority_seats = 76
| election_date = November 8, 2022
| leader1 = Matthew Ritter
| party1 = Democratic Party (United States)
| leaders_seat1 = 1st district
| last_election1 = 97
| seats_before1 = 97
| seats1 = 98
| popular_vote1 = 
| percentage1 = '''| seat_change1 =  1
| image2 = 
| leader2 = Vincent Candelora
| party2 = Republican Party (United States)
| leaders_seat2 = 86th district
| last_election2 = 54
| seats_before2 = 54
| seats2 = 53
| popular_vote2 = 
| percentage2 = 
| seat_change2 =  1
| map_image = 
| map_size = 220px
| map_caption = Results by district  
| title = Speaker
| before_election = Matthew Ritter
| before_party = Democratic Party (United States)
| after_election = Matthew Ritter
| after_party = Democratic Party (United States)
}}

The 2022 Connecticut House of Representatives election''' was held on Tuesday, November 8, 2022, to elect members to the Connecticut House of Representatives, one from each of the state's 151 General Assembly districts. The date of this the election corresponded with other elections in the state, including U.S. Senate, U.S. House, and the Connecticut State Senate. Democrats retained control of the House of Representatives, expanding their majority winning 98 seats to the Republicans 53, a net gain of 1. Democrats have held a majority in the House of Representatives since 1987.

Predictions

Overview

Detailed results

District 1 
Democratic incumbent Matthew Ritter won reelection to a 7th term after running unopposed. Ritter has represented the 1st District since 2011.

District 2 
Democratic incumbent Raghib Allie-Brennan won reelection to a 3rd term after defeating Republican candidate Jenn Lewis. Allie-Brennan was also nominated by the Working Families Party, while Lewis was also nominated by the Independent Party. Allie-Brennan has represented the 2nd District since 2019.

District 3 
Democratic incumbent Minnie Gonzalez was reelected to a 14th term after running unopposed. Gonzalez has represented the 3rd District since 1997.

District 4 
Democratic incumbent Julio Concepcion was reelected to a 3rd full term after running unopposed. Concepcion has represented the 4th District since 2018, when he won the special election to fill the vacancy left by Democrat Angel Arce, who resigned effective April 9, 2018, due to allegations that he sent inappropriate Facebook messages to a 16-year-old girl.

District 5 
Democratic incumbent Maryam Khan was reelected to a 1st full term after defeating Republican candidate Charles Jackson and Independent candidate Elijah El-Hajj-Bey. Khan has represented the 5th District since 2022, when she won the special election to fill the vacancy left by Democrat Brandon McGee, who resigned on January 7, 2022, to work on Governor Ned Lamont's reelection campaign.

District 6 
Democratic incumbent Edwin Vargas, Jr. was reelected to a 6th term after running unopposed. Vargas was also nominated by the Working Families party. District 6 is currently vacant after Vargas resigned on January 3, 2023, to pursue an academic post in the state university system. Vargas previously represented the district since 2013.

District 7 
Democratic incumbent Joshua Malik Hall was reelected to a 3rd full term after running unopposed. Hall has represented District 7 since 2017, when he won the special election to fill the vacancy left by Democrat Douglas McCrory, who was elected to the state senate.

District 8 
Republican incumbent Tim Ackert was reelected to a 7th term after defeating Democratic candidate Mary Ann Hansen. Hansen was also nominated by the Working Families Party. Ackert has represented the 8th District since 2011.

District 9 
Democratic incumbent Jason Rojas was reelected to an 8th term after defeating Republican candidate Matthew Lauf. Rojas has represented the 9th District since 2009.

District 10 
Democratic incumbent Henry Genga was reelected to a 9th term after running unopposed. Genga has represented the 10th District since 2007.

District 11 
Democratic incumbent Jeff Currey was reelected to a 5th term after running unopposed. Currey has represented the 11th District since 2015.

District 12 
Democratic incumbent Geoff Luxenberg was reelected to a 3rd term after running unopposed. Luxenberg was also nominated by the Working Families Party. Luxenberg has represented the 12th District since 2019.

District 13 
Democratic incumbent Jason Doucette was reelected to a 3rd term after defeating Republican candidate Donna Meier. Doucette was also nominated by the Independent Party and Working Families Party. Doucette has represented the 13th District since 2019.

District 14 
Republican incumbent Tom Delnicki was reelected to a 4th term after defeating Democratic candidate Erica Evans and United Community candidate Marek Kozikowski. Delnicki was also nominated by the Independent Party.
Delnicki has represented the 14th District since 2017.

District 15 
Democratic incumbent Bobby Gibson was reelected to a 3rd full term after running unopposed. Gibson has represented the 15th District since 2018, when he won the special election to fill the vacancy left by Democrat David Baram, who was elected as the 3rd District Probate Court judge.

District 16

District 17

District 18

District 19

District 20

District 21

District 22

District 23 
Republican incumbent Devin Carney was reelected to a 5th term after defeating Democratic candidate Colin Heffernan. Carney was also nominated by the Independent Party. Carney has represented the 23rd district since 2015.

District 24

District 25

District 26

District 27

District 28

District 29 
Democratic incumbent Kerry Szeps Wood was reelected to a 3rd term after defeating Republican candidate Pankaj Prakash. Wood has represented the 29th district since 2019.

District 30

District 31

District 32

District 33

District 34

District 35 
Republican candidate Chris Aniskovich was elected after defeating Democratic incumbent Christine Goupil. Goupil was also nominated by the Independent Party.

District 36 
Incumbent Democrat Christine Palm is running for re-election.

District 37

District 38

District 39

District 40

District 41

District 42 
Democratic candidate Keith Denning was elected after defeating Republican candidate Kim Healy. Healy was also nominated by the Independent Party. This seat was previously held by Republican Mike France since 2015.

District 43

District 44

District 45

District 46

District 47

District 48 
Republican candidate Mark DeCaprio was elected after defeating Democratic candidate Christopher Rivers. DeCaprio was also nominated by the Independent Party. This seat was previously held by Democrat Brian Smith since 2020.

District 49

District 50

District 51

District 52

District 53

District 54

District 55

District 56

District 57

District 58

District 59

District 60

District 61

District 62

District 63

District 64

District 65

District 66

District 67

District 68

District 69

District 70

District 71

District 72

District 73

District 74

District 75

District 76

District 77

District 78

District 79

District 80

District 81 
Democratic candidate Christopher Poulos was elected after narrowly defeating Republican candidate Tony Morrison by 1 vote. Morrison was also nominated by the Independent Party. This seat was previously held by Republican John Fusco since 2017.

District 82

District 83

District 84

District 85

District 86

District 87

District 88

District 89

District 90

District 91

District 92

District 93

District 94

District 95

District 96

District 97

District 98

District 99

District 100 
Democratic incumbent Quentin Williams was reelected to a 3rd term after running unopposed. Williams was also nominated by the Working Families Party. The 100th District is currently vacant as on January 5, 2023, Williams was killed in a head-on collision while driving southbound on Connecticut Route 9 in Cromwell when a northbound vehicle entered the lane and struck his car. Williams previously represented the district since 2019.

District 101

District 102

District 103

District 104

District 105

District 106

District 107

District 108

District 109

District 110

District 111

District 112

District 113

District 114

District 115

District 116

District 117

District 118

District 119

District 120 
Republican candidate Laura Dancho was elected after defeating Democratic incumbent Philip Young. Dancho was also nominated by the Independent Party. This seat was previously held by Democrat Philip Young since 2018.

District 121

District 122

District 123

District 124

District 125

District 126

District 127

District 128

District 129

District 130

District 131

District 132

District 133

District 134 
Democratic candidate Sarah Keitt was elected after narrowly defeating Republican candidate Meghan McCloat. McCloat was also nominated by the Independent Party. This district was previously represented by Laura Devlin since 2015.

District 135

District 136

District 137

District 138 
Republican candidate Rachel Chaleski was elected after defeating Democratic incumbent Kenneth Gucker. Chaleski was also nominated by the Independent Party. This seat was previously held by Democrat Kenneth Gucker since 2019.

District 139

District 140

District 141

District 142

District 143

District 144

District 145

District 146

District 147

District 148

District 149 
Democratic candidate Rachel Khanna was elected after defeating Republican incumbent Kimberly Fiorello. Fiorello was also nominated by the Independent Party. This seat was previously held by Republican Kimberly Fiorello since 2021.

District 150 
Democratic incumbent Steve Meskers won reelection to a 3rd  term defeating Republican Ed Lopez. Meskers has represented the 150th District since 2019.

District 151 
Democratic candidate Hector Arzeno was elected after defeating Republican candidate Peter Sherr. This seat was previously held by Republican Harry Arora since 2020.

See also
 2022 Connecticut elections
 2022 Connecticut State Senate election
 2022 United States House of Representatives elections in Connecticut

References

External links 

House 2022
House of Representatives
Connecticut House